Shanti is the fourth and the last studio album by Japanese singer and songwriter Aiko Kitahara. It was released on September 26, 2007, through Giza Studio. Title "Shanti" means in Sanskrit language "Peace".

The album consists of three previous released singles, such as Mou Kokoro Yuretarishinaide, Sekaijuu Doko wo Sagashitemo and Samba Night.

Two tracks out of twelve were composed by Aiko herself. First press release included special photobook Photo MessageIII. A special website was launched to promote album.

The album charted at #87 on the Oricon charts in its first week. It charted for two weeks.

Before retirement she released best of album "Aiko Kitahara Best" in 2009.

Track listing

In media
Mou Kokoro Yuretarishinaide - 7th ending theme for Anime television series MÄR
Sekaijuu Doko wo Sagashitemo – ending theme for Anime television series Kekkaishi
SAMBA NIGHT – theme song for Tokyo Broadcasting System Television program Doors 2007

References

2007 albums
Aiko Kitahara albums
Being Inc. albums
Japanese-language albums
Giza Studio albums
Albums produced by Daiko Nagato